Paul Patton may refer to:
 Paul E. Patton (born 1937), governor of Kentucky from 1995 until 2003
 Paul R. Patton (born 1950), professor of philosophy at the University of New South Wales, Sydney, Australia

See also
 Paul Patten or the Fox, a fictional superhero in MLJ Comics and DC comics
 Paul Patten (ice hockey) (1920–1992), American ice hockey coach